Alec Francis Roy Chamberlain (born 20 June 1964) is an English former professional footballer who played as a  goalkeeper. He made 788 league appearances during his 25-year playing career, the final 11 years and 247 appearances of which were with Watford.

Career
Chamberlain started his career at Ipswich as a trainee, but didn't make a single appearance for the club, moving to Colchester in 1982. He spent 5 years at Layer Road before joining Everton for £80,000. However, the then 23-year-old was unable to displace established Everton goalkeeper Neville Southall, and his only appearances in the 1987–88 season were during a loan spell at Tranmere.

Having failed to make a single first team appearance for Everton in a year there, Chamberlain signed for Luton Town in the summer of 1988 whilst living in Northampton, where he ousted Les Sealey after Sealey had a poor game in the League Cup Final against Nottingham Forest. Chamberlain became first choice goalkeeper for the next four seasons. He did have a loan spell as understudy to Dave Beasant at Chelsea in the 1992–93, but didn't make any first team appearances.

After signing for Sunderland in 1993, Chamberlain played regularly, making 90 league appearances over 3 years. He was part of the team that was promoted in 1995–96. Towards the end of the 1994–95 season, he was loaned to Liverpool as understudy to David James after previous deputy Michael Stensgaard suffered an off-the-field injury. Despite never playing a game for the Anfield side he collected a Football League Cup winner's medal as he was a non-playing substitute in the final.

In the summer of 1996 he was allowed to join recently relegated Watford, who paid £40,000 for him. He started off unable to get in the team, but finally played when first-choice goalkeeper and two-time Player of the Season Kevin Miller was sold to Crystal Palace in the 1997 close season. Now the first-choice goalkeeper, he was part of the Division Two Championship winning side in 1997–98, becoming Player of the Season in the process. He continued to play an important role as Watford gained promotion to the Premier League in 1999. In the playoff semi-final second leg against Birmingham City, his save denied Birmingham a winning goal, and won the match for Watford with a penalty shootout save from Chris Holland in sudden-death. He appeared at Wembley when Watford beat Bolton Wanderers 2–0 in the final.

In Watford's Premiership campaign, Chamberlain started off with an injury, and had to wait six games before he could play again. Watford were relegated to Division One at the end of the season. The club signed Tottenham goalkeeper Espen Baardsen, and the two players competed for the starting position through the 2000–01 season. When Gianluca Vialli arrived as Watford manager at the end of the season, he selected Baardsen as his first choice, but Chamberlain returned to the side in October 2001 and kept his place, finishing as Player of the Season for the second time in five years.

Under Ray Lewington, he was first-choice for the whole of the 2002–03 season. In 2003–04 he started as first-choice, but lost his place to Lenny Pidgeley for several months, before regaining his place towards the end of the campaign. Chamberlain, now 40, took the job of goalkeeping coach in the autumn of 2004.

Chamberlain was given a testimonial by Watford. With Chamberlain in goal Watford lost to Premiership side Charlton Athletic 2–1. Various events were run throughout the season to celebrate Chamberlain's 10 years at the club.

On 20 July 2006, after Watford's promotion to the Premier League via the Championship playoffs, he signed a new one-year contract keeping him as player at Vicarage Road until summer 2007 making him, at 42, the oldest Premier League player in 2006–07. On 13 May 2007, Chamberlain came on as a substitute to become one of the oldest Premier League players ever. On 19 May 2007 it was announced that Chamberlain would be retiring from playing and would concentrate on his coaching role at the club.

Honours

Club
Everton
 FA Charity Shield Winner (1): 1987

Liverpool
 Football League Cup Winner (1): 1994–95

Sunderland
 Football League Division One Winner (1): 1995–96

Watford
 Football League Division One Playoff Winner (1): 1998–99
 Football League Division Two Winner (1): 1997–98

Individual
 PFA Team of the Year (1): 1997–98
 Colchester United Player of the Year (1): 1985
 Watford Player of the Season (2): 1997–98, 2001–02

References

External links
 
 Alec Chamberlain's official website

1964 births
Living people
English footballers
People from March, Cambridgeshire
Association football goalkeepers
Ipswich Town F.C. players
Colchester United F.C. players
Everton F.C. players
Tranmere Rovers F.C. players
Luton Town F.C. players
Chelsea F.C. players
Sunderland A.F.C. players
Liverpool F.C. players
Watford F.C. players
Watford F.C. non-playing staff
Premier League players
English Football League players
Association football goalkeeping coaches